The following is a partial list of the "G" codes for Medical Subject Headings (MeSH), as defined by the United States National Library of Medicine (NLM).

This list continues the information at List of MeSH codes (G10). Codes following these are found at List of MeSH codes (G12). For other MeSH codes, see List of MeSH codes.

The source for this content is the set of 2006 MeSH Trees from the NLM.

– musculoskeletal, neural, and ocular physiology

– musculoskeletal physiology

– musculoskeletal physiologic phenomena
  – bone density
  – hand strength
  – muscle fatigue
  – muscle tonus
  – musculoskeletal equilibrium
  – physical endurance
  – anaerobic threshold
  – exercise tolerance
  – posture
  – head-down tilt
  – prone position
  – supine position
  – range of motion, articular

– musculoskeletal physiologic processes
  – bone remodeling
  – bone regeneration
  – osseointegration
  – bone resorption
  – osteolysis
  – exertion
  – exercise
  – movement
  – eye movements
  – flight, animal
  – gait
  – head movements
  – locomotion
  – running
  – jogging
  – swimming
  – walking
  – dependent ambulation
  – motor activity
  – freezing reaction, cataleptic
  – running
  – jogging
  – immobility response, tonic
  – swimming
  – walking
  – pronation
  – supination
  – muscle contraction
  – isometric contraction
  – isotonic contraction
  – muscle relaxation
  – diastole
  – myocardial contraction
  – diastole
  – systole
  – uterine contraction
  – musculoskeletal development
  – bone development
  – calcification, physiologic
  – maxillofacial development
  – osteogenesis
  – chondrogenesis
  – muscle development

– nervous system physiology

– arousal
  – wakefulness

– axonal transport

– cerebrospinal fluid pressure
  – intracranial pressure

– chronaxy

– dominance, cerebral
  – laterality

– evoked potentials
  – contingent negative variation
  – event-related potentials, p300
  – evoked potentials, auditory
  – cochlear microphonic potentials
  – evoked potentials, auditory, brain stem
  – evoked potentials, motor
  – evoked potentials, somatosensory
  – evoked potentials, visual
  – excitatory postsynaptic potentials

– habituation (psychophysiology)

– higher nervous activity

– kindling (neurology)

– membrane potentials
  – action potentials
  – myoelectric complex, migrating

– nerve regeneration

– neural conduction
  – recruitment (neurology)
  – refractory period, neurologic

– neural inhibition

– neuroimmunomodulation

– neuronal plasticity
  – long-term depression (physiology)
  – long-term potentiation

– neurosecretion

– dominance, ocular

– reaction time

– reflex
  – baroreflex
  – blinking
  – gagging
  – piloerection
  – reflex, abdominal
  – reflex, abnormal
  – reflex, acoustic
  – reflex, monosynaptic
  – h-reflex
  – reflex, oculocardiac
  – reflex, pupillary
  – reflex, stretch
  – reflex, vestibulo-ocular
  – startle reaction

– sensation
  – gravity perception
  – hearing
  – auditory perception
  – speech perception
  – bone conduction
  – otoacoustic emissions, spontaneous
  – pain
  – arthralgia
  – pain threshold
  – proprioception
  – kinesthesis
  – musculoskeletal equilibrium
  – smell
  – taste
  – taste threshold
  – temperature sense
  – touch
  – stereognosis
  – vision
  – phosphenes
  – vision, entoptic

– sleep
  – sleep deprivation
  – sleep stages
  – sleep, rem

– speech
  – speech acoustics
  – speech intelligibility

– spreading cortical depression

– synaptic transmission

– ocular physiology

– ocular physiologic phenomena
  – afterimage
  – dominance, ocular
  – evoked potentials, visual
  – eye color
  – figural aftereffect
  – flicker fusion
  – glare
  – intraocular pressure
  – refraction, ocular
  – vision
  – phosphenes
  – vision, binocular
  – vision, entoptic
  – vision, monocular
  – visual acuity
  – contrast sensitivity
  – visual fields
  – vision disparity

– ocular physiologic processes
  – accommodation, ocular
  – adaptation, ocular
  – dark adaptation
  – blinking
  – eye movements
  – convergence, ocular
  – fixation, ocular
  – nystagmus, physiologic
  – nystagmus, optokinetic
  – pursuit, smooth
  – saccades
  – phototransduction
  – visual perception
  – color perception
  – depth perception
  – form perception
  – motion perception
  – pattern recognition, visual

The list continues at List of MeSH codes (G12).

G11